The Television House (in Norwegian, Fjernsynshuset) is one of the main buildings at NRK headquarters at Marienlyst in Oslo. The other main building is  Broadcasting House.

The house was designed by Nils Holter and Jan Bauck and opened in 1969.

News produced at Television house includes content for Dagsrevyen (TV), Dagsnytt (radio), NRK Nyheter (radio) as well as online news services.

NRK
Buildings and structures in Oslo
1969 establishments in Norway
Buildings and structures completed in 1969